Bruno Soares and Kevin Ullyett were the defending champions. Ullyett retired from professional tennis in 2009.
As a result, Soares partnered up with his compatriot Marcelo Melo, but they lost in semifinals against Eric Butorac and Jean-Julien Rojer.
Butorac and Rojer won their second doubles title in this year (last win in Tokyo). They defeated Johan Brunström and Jarkko Nieminen 6–3, 6–4 in the final.

Seeds

Draw

Draw

External links
 Main Draw

If Stockholm Open - Doubles
2010 Stockholm Open